Gikyokuonsou (戯曲音創) is a progressive rock album by Japanese musician Motoi Sakuraba. It was originally released on October 3, 1991, by Made in Japan Records, later by the French label Musea and in 2011 by Diskunion.

Track listing
"Humpty Dumpty" – 6:26
"Tone Access" – 3:46
"Byzantium" – 6:00
"Motion" – 8:15
"Paradigm" – 4:01
"Narratage" - 5:20
"Scrap and Build" – 5:43
"Drama Composition" – 5:44

Personnel
Motoi Sakuraba – keyboards, composer, arranger
Ken Ishita – bass
Takeo Shimoda – drums

References 

1991 albums
Progressive rock albums by Japanese artists